Marcus Hardison (born February 14, 1992) is a former American football defensive tackle. He played college football at Arizona State and was drafted by the Cincinnati Bengals in the fourth round of the 2015 NFL Draft.

Early years
Hardison attended Charlotte High School in Punta Gorda, Florida. He played quarterback early in his career before moving to defensive line.

College career
Hardison attended Dodge City Community College in 2011 and 2012. During those two years, he had 96 tackles and seven sacks. In 2013, he transferred to Arizona State University. In his first year at Arizona State he appeared in 13 of 14 games, recording five tackles and a sack. As a senior in 2014, Hardison played in all 13 games, recording 53 tackles, a team-leading 10 sacks and one interception.

Professional career

Cincinnati Bengals
Hardison was drafted by the Cincinnati Bengals in the fourth round, 135th overall, in the 2015 NFL Draft. He made the Bengals final roster, but was inactive for every game in 2015 including the playoffs.

Hardison suffered a shoulder injury in the third preseason game and was out for the 2016 season.

On September 2, 2017, Hardison was released by the Bengals.

Jacksonville Jaguars
On September 20, 2017, Hardison was signed to the Jacksonville Jaguars' practice squad. He was released on November 20, 2017.

New England Patriots
On December 2, 2017, Hardison was signed to the New England Patriots' practice squad. He was released on December 19, 2017.

Houston Texans
On December 21, 2017, Hardison was signed to the Houston Texans' practice squad. He signed a reserve/future contract with the Texans on January 1, 2018.

On August 27, 2018, Hardison was waived by the Texans.

Los Angeles Chargers
On August 28, 2018, Hardison was claimed off waivers by the Los Angeles Chargers. He was waived on September 1, 2018.

Arizona Hotshots
In late 2018, Hardison signed with the Arizona Hotshots of the Alliance of American Football. He was waived on March 25, 2019.

St. Louis BattleHawks
In October 2019, Hardison was selected by the St. Louis BattleHawks in the 2020 XFL Draft. He was waived during final roster cuts on January 22, 2020.

References

External links
Arizona State Sun Devils bio

1992 births
Living people
People from Punta Gorda, Florida
Players of American football from Florida
American football defensive tackles
American football defensive ends
Dodge City Conquistadors football players
Arizona State Sun Devils football players
Cincinnati Bengals players
Jacksonville Jaguars players
New England Patriots players
Houston Texans players
Los Angeles Chargers players
Arizona Hotshots players
St. Louis BattleHawks players